Luchuan County is a county of Guangxi, China. It is under the administration of Yulin city.

Climate

References

 
Counties of Guangxi
Yulin, Guangxi